Nastassia Puzakova (born 12 December 1993) is a Belarusian steeplechase runner. She competed at the 2016 Summer Olympics in the women's 3000 metres steeplechase race; her time of 10:14.08 in the heats did not qualify her for the final.

References

1993 births
Living people
Belarusian female steeplechase runners
Olympic athletes of Belarus
Athletes (track and field) at the 2016 Summer Olympics